Parviz Jalayer  (6 October 1939 – 6 July 2019) was an Iranian weightlifter. He competed at the 1964 and 1968 Olympics and won a silver medal in 1968. In 1966 he won a gold medal at the Asian Games and a bronze at the World Championships. The following year he set a world record in the clean and jerk. After retiring from competitions he worked as a weightlifting coach.

References 

1939 births
2019 deaths
World Weightlifting Championships medalists
Iranian male weightlifters
Iranian strength athletes
Olympic weightlifters of Iran
Olympic silver medalists for Iran
Weightlifters at the 1964 Summer Olympics
Weightlifters at the 1968 Summer Olympics
Asian Games gold medalists for Iran
Olympic medalists in weightlifting
Asian Games medalists in weightlifting
Weightlifters at the 1966 Asian Games
Medalists at the 1968 Summer Olympics
Medalists at the 1966 Asian Games